The Appointments Committee of the Cabinet (ACC)  appoints several top posts within the Government of India.

The committee is composed of the Prime Minister of India (ex-officio Chairman) and the Minister of Home Affairs. Originally the Minister-in-charge of the concerned Ministry was also part of the committee but since July 2016, those ministers are excluded from this committee.

Appointments decided
The Establishment Officer’s Division (EO Division) processes all proposals for senior appointments in the Government of India that require the approval of the Appointments Committee of the Cabinet under the Government of India Transactions of Business Rules, 1961. The committee makes appointments to posts of:
 Chief of Defence Staff
Chiefs of three services (COAS, CNS, CAS)
Chiefs of all Army, Naval and Air Force Commands (GOC-in-C, FOC-in-C, AOC-in-C)
Director, Central Bureau of Investigation (this committee consists of the Prime Minister, the Chief Justice of India, and the Leader of the Opposition in Lok Sabha)
Director General, Defence Intelligence Agency
Director General Military Operations
Scientific Advisor to the Defence Minister 
Director General Armed Forces Medical Services
Director General of Ordnance Factories (DGOF) & Chairman OFB 
Director-General of Defence Estates
Controller General of Defence Accounts
Director of Institute for Defence Studies and Analyses (MP-IDSA)
Solicitor General of India
Governor of the Reserve Bank of India
Deputy Governor of the Reserve Bank of India
Executive Director of World Bank
Chairperson and Members of the Railway Board
Chief Vigilance Officers and directors of the board in Public Sector Undertakings.
Secretariat posts of and above the rank of Joint secretary to the Government of India.
Chief of Securities and Exchange Board of India

This Committee decides on all important empanelments and shift of officers serving on Central deputation. In addition, all appointments by promotion that require ACC approval are processed through the E.O. Division. For this purpose, the Establishment Officer functions as the Secretary to the Appointments Committee of the Cabinet.

The Additional Secretary and Establishment Officer in the Department of Personnel and Training is the ex-officio Member Secretary of the Civil Services Board that is chaired by the Cabinet Secretary. This Board makes recommendations for appointments in respect of the posts of Deputy Secretary, Director and Joint Secretary under the Central Staffing Scheme. In addition, the Board makes recommendations to the ACC for the inclusion of officers in the Joint Secretaries suitability list.

Furthermore, the Establishment Officer is Member Secretary of the Screening Committee, chaired by the Cabinet Secretary and including Secretary (P) and Finance Secretary, that has been constituted for the screening of cases of assignments under Rule 6(2)(ii) of the AIS (Cadre) Rules 1954 and assignments in international organizations in respect of JS level and above officers of organized Group ‘A’ and Group ‘B’ services. The EO is also Member Secretary of the Central Establishment Board (CEB), which is chaired by Secretary (Personnel). This Board makes recommendations for deputing officers on foreign training, assessment of Central Secretariat Service officers for appointments to the posts of Deputy Secretary and Director in the Ministries/Departments as well as premature retirement under the relevant rules in respect of officers below the rank of Joint Secretary.

Cabinet Committees of India
The eight Committees of the Cabinet are:

 Appointments Committee of the Cabinet
 Cabinet Committee on Accommodation
 Cabinet Committee on Economic Affairs
 Cabinet Committee on Parliamentary Affairs
 Cabinet Committee on Political Affairs
 Cabinet Committee on Security
 Cabinet Committee on Investment and growth
 Cabinet Committee on Employment & Skill Development

All committees of the cabinet except that of Parliamentary Affairs and Accommodation are chaired by the Prime Minister. Cabinet Committee on Parliamentary Affairs is headed by Defence Minister Rajnath Singh under both Modi Govt stints i.e. 2014-19 and 2019-2024. 

In the Second Modi ministry, Prime Minister Narendra Modi formed two new committees under his chairmanship to focus on two key concerns: Employment & skill development and Investment.

See also

Constitution of India

References

Cabinet Secretariat of India